Gonghuacheng station  is a station on the Changping Line of the Beijing Subway, located in Changping District to the west of the Shahe Reservoir.

Station Layout 
The station has an elevated island platform.

Exits 
There are 4 exits, lettered A1, A2, B1, and B2. Exits A1 and B2 are accessible.

References

External links

Beijing Subway stations in Changping District
Railway stations in China opened in 2010